Fin de siecle is the second live album by Polish gothic rock band Closterkeller. It was released on February 29, 2000 in Poland through Polskie Radio. The album was recorded on October, 1999 at Program 3 Polskiego Radia studio, Warsaw. The cover art was created by Anja Orthodox and Marti Pietraszkiewicz, and fotos by Dariusz Kawka and Anja Orthodox.

Track listing

Personnel
 Anja Orthodox - vocal, synthesizer, lyrics
 Marcin Płuciennik - acoustic bass, backing vocal
 Paweł Pieczyński - acoustic guitar, backing vocal
 Gerard Klawe - drums, backing vocal
 Michał Rollinger - piano, synthesizer, sampler, backing vocal
 Marcin Mentel - acoustic guitar, backing vocal
Music - Closterkeller.Track 11 - music: T. Woźniak, lyrics: B. Chorążuk

Music videos
 "Zegarmistrz światła" (2000)
 "A nadzieja" (2000)

Release history

References

Closterkeller albums
2000 live albums
Polish-language live albums